Marcos Alonso Imaz (16 April 1933 – 6 March 2012), nicknamed Marquitos, was a Spanish footballer who played as a defender. He was best known for his participation in Real Madrid's five European Cup conquests, mainly in the 1950s.

Club career
Marquitos was born in Santander, Cantabria. During his career, he played for his hometown club Racing de Santander, Real Madrid, Hércules CF, Real Murcia, Calvo Sotelo and local amateurs Toluca de Santander. 

With Real Madrid, Marquitos won six La Liga championships and five European Cups. In the 1955–56 edition of the latter, he scored a rare goal as he equalised 3–3 against Stade de Reims in an eventual 4–3 victory.

International career
From 1955 to 1960, Marquitos earned two caps for Spain, appearing in as many friendlies.

Personal life and death
Marquitos' son, Marcos Alonso Peña, was also a footballer, and a coach. He represented, with success, Atlético Madrid, FC Barcelona and Spain – amongst others. His grandson Marcos Alonso Mendoza also played for Real Madrid and Spain, and also had a lengthy spell in England, notably with Bolton Wanderers and Chelsea.

Marquitos died on 6 March 2012 in his hometown of Santander, one month shy of his 79th birthday.

Honours
Real Madrid
La Liga: 1954–55, 1956–57, 1957–58, 1960–61, 1961–62
Copa del Generalísimo: 1961–62
Latin Cup: 1957
European Cup: 1955–56, 1956–57, 1957–58, 1958–59, 1959–60
Intercontinental Cup: 1960

References

External links

1933 births
2012 deaths
Spanish footballers
Footballers from Santander, Spain
Association football defenders
La Liga players
Segunda División players
Tercera División players
Rayo Cantabria players
Racing de Santander players
Real Madrid CF players
Hércules CF players
Real Murcia players
CD Puertollano footballers
UEFA Champions League winning players
Spain B international footballers
Spain international footballers
Marcos